Zilda Cardoso (4 January 1936 in São Paulo – 20 December 2019 in São Paulo) was a Brazilian actress. She was best known for her many comedic roles in TV shows such as Praça da Alegria, A Praça é Nossa and Escolinha do Professor Raimundo.

Filmography

References

External links 

2019 deaths
Brazilian actresses
1936 births
Actresses from São Paulo